Vladimir Antonovich Ivashko (Volodymyr Antonovych Ivashko; 28 October 1932 – 13 November 1994) was a Soviet Ukrainian politician, briefly acting as General Secretary of the Communist Party of the Soviet Union (CPSU) during the period from 24 to 29 August 1991. On 24 August Mikhail Gorbachev resigned from the post, and on 29 August the CPSU was suspended by the Supreme Soviet. Before becoming General Secretary he had been voted Gorbachev's Deputy General Secretary within the Party on 12 July 1990, a newly created position as a result of the 28th Congress of the Communist Party.

Biography
The Communist Party of the Soviet Union (CPSU) during the time between Mikhail Gorbachev's resignation and its suspension was politically impotent. By the time of the 28th Congress in July 1990, the party was largely regarded as being unable to lead the country and had, across the fifteen republics of the Soviet Union, split into opposing factions favouring either independent republics or the continuation of the Soviet state. Stripped of its leading role in society, the party lost its authority to lead the nation or the cohesion that kept the party united. Actual political power lay in the positions of President of the Soviet Union (held by Gorbachev) and President of the Russian SFSR (held by Boris Yeltsin). During the August Coup he did not make public statements but on behalf of the Secretariat distributed letters to local party organizations calling on them to uphold the CPSU.

Gorbachev brought in his ally Ivashko in to replace the long-serving Volodymyr Shcherbytsky as First Secretary of the Communist Party of Ukraine on 28 September 1989. Ivashko led the Communists to victory in the first relatively free parliamentary election held in the Ukrainian SSR, which took place from 4 March to 18 March 1990, the Communists winning 331 seats to the Democratic Bloc's 111 seats. Ivashko was elected by the communist majority to the post of the Chairman of the Verkhovna Rada of the Ukrainian SSR on 4 June 1990. Since the abandonment by the Communists of their "leading role" in early 1990 this position now superseded that of First Secretary of the Communist Party as the most powerful position in Ukraine.

He resigned his position as First Secretary on 22 June 1990 following opposition demonstrations against his simultaneous occupation of both the posts of First Secretary of the ruling party and Chairman of the legislature. However, on 9 July 1990 he too resigned as Chairman of the Verkhovna Rada of the Ukrainian SSR after declining to be recalled to Kyiv during the 28th Congress of the Communist Party in Moscow, and a few days later successfully secured the position of Deputy General Secretary of the CPSU.

On August 23, 1990, a secret memorandum from Ivashko outlined strategies to hide the Communist Party's assets through Russian and international joint ventures because Boris Yeltsin, who was the new president of the Russian Republic in the Soviet Union, wanted to levy taxes on the Communist Party's vast administrative property holdings and on the party itself. The memorandum was to organize the transfer of CPSU funds, CPSU financing and support of its operations through associations, ventures, foundations, etc. which are to act as invisible economics. In November 1990, the offshore structure Fimaco was formed by the Russian Central Bank, then known as Gosbank, to hide these funds. According to Sergei Tretyakov, KGB chief Vladimir Kryuchkov sent US$50 billion worth of funds of the Communist Party to an unknown location in the lead-up to the collapse of the USSR.

Following the failed August 1991 Soviet coup d'état attempt, Gorbachev resigned from his post of General Secretary of the Communist Party of the Soviet Union and Ivashko became acting General Secretary. On 29 August 1991 the activity of the CPSU was suspended throughout the country, on 6 November Yeltsin banned the activities of the party in Russia and Gorbachev resigned from the presidency on 25 December; the following day the Soviet of Republics dissolved the Soviet Union.

Ivashko retired in 1992 and died on 13 November 1994, at the age of 62, after an undetermined long illness.

Notes

References

Sources

External links
 Volodymyr Ivashko in the Encyclopedia of History of Ukraine

1932 births
1994 deaths
Politicians from Poltava
Central Committee of the Communist Party of Ukraine (Soviet Union) members
Chairmen of the Verkhovna Rada of the Ukrainian Soviet Socialist Republic
First convocation members of the Verkhovna Rada
Eleventh convocation members of the Verkhovna Rada of the Ukrainian Soviet Socialist Republic
First Secretaries of the Communist Party of Ukraine (Soviet Union)
Governors of Dnipropetrovsk Oblast
Heads of the Communist Party of the Soviet Union
Politburo of the Central Committee of the Communist Party of the Soviet Union members
Politburo of the Central Committee of the Communist Party of Ukraine (Soviet Union) members
Politicians of the Ukrainian Soviet Socialist Republic
Recipients of the Order of Friendship of Peoples
Recipients of the Order of the Red Banner of Labour
Soviet politicians
Ukrainian atheists
Ukrainian emigrants to Russia